Link is a publication of The Greenville News and Gannett. The headquarters is in Greenville, South Carolina. It features local entertainment, news, photos, reviews and more. It is a free publication and is available at almost 1,200 locations in Anderson, Greenville, Pickens and Spartanburg counties of the Upstate South Carolina.

References

Defunct magazines published in the United States
Free magazines
Local interest magazines published in the United States
Magazines with year of establishment missing
Magazines published in South Carolina
News magazines published in the United States
Magazines with year of disestablishment missing